Charles Adam Heckman was a brigadier general in the Union Army during the American Civil War.  He fought in many of the early battles in North Carolina and later served in the Army of the James during the siege of Petersburg.

Biography
Heckman was born in Pennsylvania and graduated from Minerva Seminary in 1837.  He served in the volunteer army during the Mexican War becoming a sergeant by the time he was mustered out of service in 1848.  Apart from the Civil War, Heckman spent most of his career as a conductor for the New Jersey Central Railroad.

Immediately after the Civil War began, Heckman enlisted in the 1st Pennsylvania Volunteer Regiment and was elected captain.  Before seeing any action in that regiment he was appointed major of the 9th New Jersey Volunteer Regiment.  On October 8, 1861 he became the regimental lieutenant colonel and joined Ambrose Burnside's expedition to North Carolina.  He fought at Roanoke Island and was promoted colonel just two days after the battle.  He was wounded at the battles of New Berne and Young's Crossroads.  On November 29, 1862 he was promoted to brigadier general of U.S. volunteers.

When General Burnside left for Virginia, he left Union forces in North Carolina under the command of John G. Foster.  In the winter of 1862, Foster led an expedition against the Wilmington and Weldon Railroad at Goldsboro, NC.  General Heckman led a brigade in Foster's expedition at the battles of Kinston, White Hall and Goldsboro.

Throughout most of 1863 Heckman was in command of the District of Beaufort, briefly commanding the Union defenses at New Bern.  By the end of 1863 he was sent to Virginia to command the Union garrison at Newport News, Virginia.  He temporarily commanded George W. Getty's division at the beginning of 1864.

On April 28, 1864 Heckman was assigned to command the 1st Brigade, 2nd Division, XVIII Corps in the Army of the James.  He was wounded at the battle of Port Walthall Junction and taken prisoner at the battle of Proctor's Creek.  In September 1864 he was exchanged and, when he returned to duty, was assigned to command the 2nd Division in the XVIII Corps.  Heckman led his division at the battle of Chaffin's Farm in support of General George J. Stannard's main attack against Fort Harrison.  When Heckman moved forward his troops veered off far to the north.  Instead of coming directly to the aid of Stannard's division, Heckman's men launched a costly attack against Confederate trenches near Forts Gilmer and Johnson.  During the fighting in Fort Harrison, XVIII Corps commander Edward O. C. Ord was severely wounded and carried from the field.  Heckman then assumed command of the corps.  With this change in command at a crucial point the fighting ground to a halt and the Union forces constructed a defensive line.  After an undistinguished show of leadership during the fighting on September 29, army commander Benjamin F. Butler decided to replace Heckman in command of the corps with his chief of staff, Godfrey Weitzel.  Returning to command his division, Heckman helped repulse the Confederate attack the following day.

In December Heckman was transferred to command the 3rd Division in the newly created XXV Corps.  Briefly from January to February in 1865 he was in command of the XXV Corps, but resigned from the army on May 25, 1865.  Heckman returned to work for the New Jersey Central Railroad as a conductor and railroad dispatcher following the war.

See also

List of American Civil War generals (Union)

References
 Eicher, John H., and Eicher, David J., Civil War High Commands, Stanford University Press, 2001, .
 Kennedy, Frances H., ed., The Civil War Battlefield Guide, 2nd ed., Houghton Mifflin Co., 1998, .

Union Army generals
People of New Jersey in the American Civil War
1822 births
1896 deaths
Conductor (rail)